The following is a list of people who were born in, residents of, or otherwise closely associated with Rapid City, South Dakota, and its surrounding metropolitan area, including Meade County, South Dakota, and Pennington County, South Dakota.

James Abourezk, born in Wood, South Dakota; US Representative and Senator
Maxine Asher, born in Chicago, Illinois; head of the controversial American World University, formerly based in Rapid City
Ellis Yarnal Berry, born in Larchwood, Iowa; newspaper publisher; US Representative
Joseph H. Bottum, born in Faulkton, South Dakota; former US Senator
Moses Brings Plenty, born on the Pine Ridge Indian Reservation; Lakota Sioux actor
Mark Cady, born in Rapid City; Chief Justice of the Iowa Supreme Court
Raymond W. Carpenter, United States Army Major General; acting Director of the Army National Guard
Francis H. Case, born in Everly, Iowa; former columnist for the Rapid City Journal; US Representative
Charles J. Chaput, born in Concordia, Kansas; fourth Roman Catholic bishop of Rapid City
Brandon Claussen, born in Rapid City, Major League Baseball pitcher with the Washington Nationals
Dave Collins, former Major League Baseball player and coach
Levi L. Conant, born in Littleton, Massachusetts; former professor at the South Dakota School of Mines
Helen Duhamel, resident of Rapid City, businesswoman
Crazy Horse, leader of the Oglala Sioux tribe
Blase Joseph Cupich, born in Omaha, Nebraska; fifth Catholic bishop of Rapid City
Ella Cara Deloria, born in North Dakota; anthropologist
Harold Joseph Dimmerling, born in Braddock, Pennsylvania; third Catholic bishop of Rapid City 
John Dutton, football player
David Dyson, born in Rapid City; bassist and record producer
Mark Ellis, Major League Baseball player; attended Stevens High School
Richard E. Ellsworth, United States Air Force, born in Erie, Pennsylvania; commander stationed near Rapid City for whom Ellsworth Air Force Base is named
Layne Flack, born in Rapid City; professional poker player 
Keith Foulke, born in Rapid City; former Major League Baseball pitcher
Harry Gandy, born in Churubusco, Indiana; former member of the United States House of Representatives from South Dakota 
Paul Goble, born in Heslemere, England; author and illustrator of children's books residing in Rapid City
Dick Green, born in Sioux City, Iowa; resides in Rapid City; second baseman for the Kansas City and Oakland Athletics for 11 years in the 60s and 70s
Becky Hammon, former resident of Rapid City; player for the Women's National Basketball Association's New York Liberty; played for Russian women's Olympic basketball team in 2008
Carroll Hardy, from Sturgis, South Dakota; former major league baseball player
Carole Hillard, resident of Rapid City; lieutenant governor of South Dakota
Jeremy Hinzman, born in Rapid City; Iraq War soldier turned war resister, seeking refugee status in Canada
Michael Owen Jackels, Roman Catholic bishop
John K. Konenkamp, born in Brooklyn, New York; member of the South Dakota Supreme Court; former deputy state's attorney in Rapid City 
Tomi Lahren, born in Rapid City; conservative political commentator
Randy Lewis, two-time NCAA wrestling champion; 1984 Olympic gold medalist
Kerry Ligtenberg, born in Rapid City; major league baseball pitcher
William Tibertus McCarty, born in Crawford County, Pennsylvania; second Catholic bishop of Rapid City 
Alice McCoy, member of the South Dakota State Legislature from Pennington County
Valentine McGillycuddy, former mayor of Rapid City; dean of the South Dakota School of Mines
Walter Dale Miller, born in Viewfield, South Dakota; former governor of South Dakota; retired near New Underwood 
Shams-ul-Huda Shams, born in Afghanistan; South Dakota School of Mines alumnus; former president of the Afghan Social Democratic Party 
Thomas Patten Stafford, born in Weatherford, Oklahoma; astronaut; United States Air Force general, formerly assigned to Ellsworth Air Force Base
John Stariha, born in Austria; first Roman Catholic bishop of Rapid City 
Jim Sykes, born in Rapid City; radio journalist, producer, and Alaskan politician
Karen Thurman, born in Rapid City; Democratic political activist; former U.S. House Representative (Florida)  
Alice Ivers Tubbs, frontier gambler known as "Poker Alice" who died in Rapid City in 1930
Shane Van Boening, world champion pool player, 9-ball world champion 2022
Adam Vinatieri, born in Yankton, South Dakota; placekicker for the Indianapolis Colts and the New England Patriots
Korczak Ziolkowski, from Keystone; sculptor of Crazy Horse Memorial in Pennington County

References

Rapid City
Rapid City, South Dakota